Claire B. Panosian Dunavan is an emeritus Professor of Medicine at the University of California, Los Angeles. Her research considered global health and diseases, including parasitic infections, tuberculosis and malaria. Panosian served as president of the American Society of Tropical Medicine and Hygiene in 2008. She is also a science writer, reporter and television presenter.

Early life and education 
Claire Blythe Panosian was born in Los Angeles and grew up in Santa Barbara, California. Her father survived the Guadalcanal campaign during which he suffered from malaria. Her mother attended Oregon State University and her parents founded and led a specialist food business. Despite not having much money, Panosian travelled extensively as a child, visiting the United Kingdom and other cities in Europe. Panosian realised that she was interested in science when she was at high school. Panosian earned her undergraduate degree at Stanford University, where she majored in history and pre-medical sciences. After graduating Panosian moved to Haiti, where she worked in a rural hospital on the diagnosis of conditions such as malnutrition and malaria. Panosian moved to Northwestern University for her medical degree, which she completed in 1976, before starting her residency training at the London School of Hygiene & Tropical Medicine and Tripler Army Medical Center. When she returned to Chicago she became an expert in leprosy and neurocysticercosis. Panosian completed her specialist training at the Tufts-New England Medical Center, where she conducted research in leishmaniasis.

Research and career 
In 1984 Panosian joined the faculty at University of California, Los Angeles (UCLA) as the Chief of Infectious Diseases at Los Angeles County-Olive View Medical Center. Here Panosian dealt with the beginning of the HIV epidemic, at a time without blood tests or anti-virals. In 1987 she moved to the main campus of UCLA, where she founded the Travel and Tropical Medicine Program. She founded the Global Health program in 2005. Alongside her academic career in California, Panosian worked in Tanzania, Vietnam, the Philippines and Taiwan. Panosian was elected president of the American Society of Tropical Medicine and Hygiene in 2008.

Broadcasting 
Panosian worked as a medical editor for the television network Lifetime, where she hosted a weekly medical news show Physician’s Journal. She was awarded a Freddie Award for her interview with a dying physician. She has written for the Los Angeles Times, The Baltimore Sun, The Washington Post, Discover magazine and Scientific American.

Selected publications 
Her publications include:

Personal life 
Panosian is married to the documentary filmmaker Patrick Dunavan. Together they created a documentary on Hepatitis B.

References

External links

 
  (See ''Angiostrongylus cantonensis.)
 
 
  (presented by Claire Panosian Dunavan on May 4, 2022)
 

1951 births
Living people
David Geffen School of Medicine at UCLA faculty
Stanford University alumni
Northwestern University alumni
American women physicians
American women academics
21st-century American women
Presidents of the American Society of Tropical Medicine and Hygiene
American people of Armenian descent